Autisterna (Swedish for autists) is a 1979 novel by Swedish writer Stig Larsson.

References

1979 Swedish novels
Swedish-language novels